Henry Ashworth may refer to:

Henry Ashworth (naval officer) (1785–1811), British lieutenant
Henry Ashworth (nonconformist) (1794–1880), English cotton manufacturer